The 2011–12 Scottish League Cup was the 66th season of Scotland's second-most prestigious football knockout competition, the Scottish League Cup, also known as the Scottish Communities League Cup for sponsorship reasons. It was won by Kilmarnock

Format
The competition is a single elimination knock-out competition. In each round, fixtures are determined by random draw, with the First Round to Third Round seeded according to last season's league positions (higher 50% of finishers drawn v lower 50% of finishers, alternating which is at home with each tie drawn).

Fixtures are played to a finish, with extra time and then penalties used in the event of ties. The competition is open to all clubs in the Scottish Premier League and Scottish Football League. Clubs involved in European competitions are given a bye to the third round to avoid congestion of fixtures.

First round: The 30 sides from the previous season's Scottish Football League enter (including Dunfermline, promoted to the SPL).
Second round: The 15 winners of the First Round are joined by 7 of the 8 of last season's SPL sides not in Europe (including Hamilton, relegated to the First Division).
Third round: The 11 winners of the Second Round are joined by Kilmarnock plus the 4 SPL sides in Europe.
Quarter-finals: The 8 winners of the third round play.
Semi-finals: The 4 winners of the quarter-finals play.
Final: The 2 winners of the semi-finals play.

Adjustments from the previous editions
The Cup is now sponsored by the Scottish Government.

Schedule
Round 1:          Saturday 30 July
Round 2:          Tuesday 23 & Wednesday 24 August
Round 3:          Tuesday 20 & Wednesday 21 September
Quarter-finals:   Tuesday 25 & Wednesday 26 October
Semi-finals:      Saturday 28 & Sunday 29 January 2012, Hampden Park, Glasgow
Final:            Sunday 18 March, Hampden Park, Glasgow

Fixtures and results

First round
The First round draw was conducted on Thursday 2 June 2011 at 2:15pm at Ravenscraig Sports Centre in Motherwell. All matches were played on Saturday 30 July 2011 at 15:00.

Second round
The Second round draw took place at 1:00pm on Tuesday 2 August at the Highland Football Academy, Dingwall. The ties are due to be played on Tuesday 23/ Wednesday 24 August 2011.

Third round
The Third round draw was conducted on Monday 29 August. The top 5 teams of last years Scottish Premier League will join the 11 winners from the second round. The 8 ties will be played on 20/21 September.

Seeded Teams:
Aberdeen, Celtic, Dundee United, Heart of Midlothian, Kilmarnock, Motherwell and Rangers and St Johnstone.

Unseeded Teams:
Airdrie United, Ayr United, East Fife, Falkirk, Hibernian, Queen of the South, Ross County and St Mirren

Quarter-finals
The Quarter-finals draw was conducted on Thursday 22 September. The 4 ties will be played on 25/26 October.

Semi-finals
The draw for the semi-finals took place at Hampden Park on 1 November 2011 at 2pm. Celtic beat Falkirk 3–1, while Ayr United took on Kilmarnock in an historic Ayrshire derby. Kilmarnock won 1–0. The Ayrshire derby was the first such game to take place in such a late stage of a major tournament.

Final

References

External links
 Official site
 Results Soccerway

2010-11
2011–12 in Scottish football cups
Cup